The New Hampshire Department of State is a government agency of the U.S. state of New Hampshire, based at the State House in Concord. The department is led by the Secretary of State, who is chartered to oversee all state elections and keep the official records of the state per the Constitution of New Hampshire as adopted in 1784. The Secretary is elected biannually by the New Hampshire General Court (state legislature).

Organization
The department is organized into seven divisions:
 Administration Division
 Corporation Division
 Division of Archives and Records Management
 Division of Uniform Commercial Code
 Division of Elections
 Division of Securities Regulation
 Division of Vital Records Administration

Administratively attached to the department are:
 New Hampshire Board of Auctioneers
 New Hampshire–Canadian Trade Council
 New Hampshire Ballot Law Commission

The department also commissions notaries public within the state.

References

External links

State
Government agencies established in 1784
1784 establishments in New Hampshire